Largus californicus, also known as the California bordered plant bug, is a species of bordered plant bug in the family Largidae. It is found in western North America, as well as parts of Central America. 

Adults have a black exoskeleton with orange edges on the thorax and abdomen. Nymphs are metallic blue, later with a red spot at the base of the abdomen. They are indistinguishable in appearance from Largus cinctus.

References

Largidae
Articles created by Qbugbot
Insects described in 1923